Olga Vargas (born 18 March 1980) is a Mexican former synchronized swimmer.

Olga competed in the women's duet at the 2004 Olympic Games with her partner Nara Falcón and finished in sixteenth place.

References 

1980 births
Living people
Mexican synchronized swimmers
Olympic synchronized swimmers of Mexico
Synchronized swimmers at the 2004 Summer Olympics
Swimmers from Mexico City
Synchronized swimmers at the 2003 Pan American Games
Pan American Games competitors for Mexico